Niels Vandenbroucke (born 15 March 1991) is a Belgian footballer who currently plays for Sparta Petegem.

Career
Vandenbroucke made his debut for Zulte-Waregem on 14 April 2012 during the play-off game against K. Beerschot AC, where he was brought on the pitch 3 minutes before the end. Two weeks later, for the first time in his professional career he appeared in Zulte's starting squad against RAEC Mons.

Player career

References

External links

1991 births
Living people
Belgian footballers
S.V. Zulte Waregem players
Belgian Pro League players
Association football defenders
Royal FC Mandel United players